The 1998 Paris Open was a men's tennis tournament played on indoor carpet courts. It was the 26th edition of the Paris Masters, and is part of the ATP Super 9 of the 1998 ATP Tour. It took place at the Palais omnisports de Paris-Bercy in Paris, France, from 2 November through 9 November 1998. Thirteenth-seeded Greg Rusedski won the singles title.

Finals

Singles

 Greg Rusedski defeated  Pete Sampras 6–4, 7–6(7–4), 6–3
It was Greg Rusedski's 2nd singles title of the year and his 7th overall. It was his 1st Masters title of the year, and overall.

Doubles

 Mahesh Bhupathi /  Leander Paes defeated  Jacco Eltingh /  Paul Haarhuis 6–4, 6–2

References

External links
 ATP tournament profile